, also known by its English title "The Assassin's Assassin," is a single by Japanese jazz band Soil & "Pimp" Sessions, featuring singer and songwriter Ringo Sheena. It was released on June 12, 2013, digitally and on June 26 as a single, two months after Soil & "Pimp" Sessions' single "Jazzy Conversation," and one month after Sheena's single "Irohanihoheto/Kodoku no Akatsuki."

Background and development 

Ringo Sheena had taken an interest in the band in the early 2000s, attending live concerts of theirs before their debut in 2003. They had collaborated several times in the past, the first time on the digital single "Karisome Otome (Death Jazz Version)" in 2006. They collaborated again in 2009 on Sheena's song "Mayakashi Yasaotoko" from the album Sanmon Gossip, and the Soil & "Pimp" Sessions song "My Foolish Heart" on their album 6.

"Koroshiya Kiki Ippatsu" was a single released to commemorate Soil & "Pimp" Sessions' 10th anniversary. It was the second collaboration single released by Soil & "Pimp" Sessions in 2013, after "Jazzy Conversation" with Rhymester. These were compiled on the album Circles, an album featuring Soil & "Pimp" Sessions collaborating with different vocalists. Similarly, at the end of 2013, Ringo Sheena released the album Ukina, an album that compiled collaborations she had undertaken between 1998 and 2013.

Writing and production 

The song features an arrangement by conductor Neko Saito, who has collaborated with Sheena on many occasions. This was rare for Soil & "Pimp" Sessions, as they generally did not collaborate with outside arrangers for their music. As such, the song features many instruments that are not present in other Soil & "Pimp" Sessions songs: a string section, the timpani, and the harp. A bonus track on Circles, "Koroshiya Kiki Ippatsu (Death Jazz Ver.)," features an arrangement by Soil & "Pimp" Sessions.

Promotion and release 

On September 27, 2013, Soil & "Pimp" Sessions held a live at Billboard Live in Tokyo. Sheena made a guest appearance, performing "Koroshiya Kiki Ippatsu" and her previous collaborations with the band, "My Foolish Heart" and "Karisome Otome." The single's B-side "Pimp Panther" was also performed by the band. During Sheena's Tōtaikai concerts in November 2013, she performed "Koroshiya Kiki Ippatsu" with her concert band.

Music video 

The Yuichi Kodama-directed music video was released on June 1, 2013. It features the members of Soil & "Pimp" Sessions as assassins on a luxury liner, and Sheena as a woman manipulating them. The video was nominated at the 2014 MTV Video Music Awards Japan for the Best Collaboration video.

Track listing

Personnel

Personnel details were sourced from Sheena's official website.

Soil & "Pimp" Sessions

Goldman Akita – contrabass
Jōsei – piano, keyboards
Midorin – drums
Motoharu – saxophone
Shachō – agitator, songwriting (track 3)
Tabu Zombie – trumpet, songwriting (track 1, 2)

Other musicians

Tomoyuki Asakawa – harp (track 1)
Great Eida – concert master (track 1)
Midori Eida – violin (track 1)
Takashi Hamano – violin (track 1)
Ayano Kasahara – cello (track 1)
Eriko Kawano – viola (track 1)
Ayumu Koshikawa – violin (track 1)
Nobuhiko Maeda – cello (track 1)
Yoshihiko Maeda – cello (track 1)
Yukinori Murata – violin (track 1)
Tatsuo Ogura – violin (track 1)
Neko Saito – conductor (track 1)
Ringo Sheena – vocals, songwriting (track 1)
Midori Takada – timpani (track 1)
Mayu Takashima – viola (track 1)
Kōjirō Takizawa – violin (track 1)
Chizuko Tsunoda – violin (track 1)
Daisuke Yamamoto – violin (track 1)
Haruko Yano – violin (track 1)

Chart rankings

Sales and certifications

Release history

References 

2013 songs
Japanese-language songs
Ringo Sheena songs
Songs written by Ringo Sheena
2013 singles
Victor Entertainment singles
Music videos directed by Yuichi Kodama